John Paul (June 30, 1839 – November 1, 1901) was a United States representative from Virginia and a United States district judge of the United States District Court for the Western District of Virginia.

Education and career

Born on June 30, 1839, near Ottobine, Rockingham County, Virginia, Paul attended the common schools and Roanoke College in Salem, Virginia. He received a Bachelor of Laws in 1867 from the University of Virginia School of Law. He served in the Confederate States Army during the American Civil War from 1861 to 1865, attaining the rank of captain in the First Virginia Cavalry. He was admitted to the bar and entered private practice in Harrisonburg, Virginia from 1867 to 1877. He was commonwealth attorney for Rockingham County from 1870 to 1877. He was a member of the Senate of Virginia from Rockingham County from 1877 to 1880.

Military service

During the Civil War, John Paul entered the Confederate States Army as a private in the Salem Artillery on May 1, 1861 along with his brother Paul (1846–1937), but by month's end, both had transferred to the 1st Virginia Cavalry where their brother Peter Paul Jr. (1842–1906) had enlisted. John Paul was wounded at Catlett's Station on August 22, 1862, returned to action and was promoted to 3rd lieutenant, then was wounded again and captured during the Battle of Spotsylvania Courthouse on May 7, 1864 and imprisoned at Fort Delaware. He was released on June 16, 1865, and may have been promoted captain.

Congressional service

Paul was an unsuccessful candidate for election in 1878 to the 46th United States Congress. He was elected as a Readjuster from Virginia's 7th congressional district to the United States House of Representatives of the 47th United States Congress, serving from March 4, 1881, to March 3, 1883. He presented credentials as a member-elect to the 48th United States Congress and served from March 4, 1883, until September 5, 1883, when he resigned, having been appointed to a federal judicial post. The election subsequently was successfully contested by United States Representative Charles Triplett O'Ferrall.

Federal judicial service

Paul was nominated by President Chester A. Arthur on February 27, 1883, to a seat on the United States District Court for the Western District of Virginia vacated by Judge Alexander Rives. He was confirmed by the United States Senate on March 3, 1883, and received his commission the same day. His service terminated on November 1, 1901, due to his death in Harrisonburg. He was interred in Woodbine Cemetery in Harrisonburg.

Family

Paul was the father of John Paul Jr. also a United States representative from Virginia and a United States district judge of the United States District Court for the Western District of Virginia.

Legacy

Paul dedicated a new courthouse in Harrisonburg in 1896, and delivered a carefully prepared historical address concerning the local bar. Paul donated part of the family's farm in Ottobine, Virginia to become the Paul State Forest.

Electoral history

1880; Paul was elected to the U.S. House of Representatives with 49.3% of the vote, defeating Democrat Henry C. Allen (Virginia) and Republican William C. Moseley.
1882; Paul appeared re-elected with 50.2% of the vote, defeating Democrat Charles T. O'Ferrall (who was later declared the winner) and Republican James W. Cochran.

References

Sources

 
 

1839 births
1901 deaths
Confederate States Army officers
Members of the United States House of Representatives from Virginia
County and city Commonwealth's Attorneys in Virginia
Judges of the United States District Court for the Western District of Virginia
University of Virginia School of Law alumni
Virginia state senators
Readjuster Party members of the United States House of Representatives
Readjuster Party politicians
United States federal judges appointed by Chester A. Arthur
19th-century American judges
People from Clarington
People of Virginia in the American Civil War
19th-century American politicians